Paulus Roiha (born 3 August 1980) is a Finnish former professional footballer who played as a forward.

Club career
Roiha began his Veikkausliiga career in Finland with HJK Helsinki. He was the top scorer in Finland in 2001 with 22 goals. In September 2001 he scored twice for the club against Celtic in a UEFA Cup tie, which HJK eventually lost 3–2 on aggregate. 
Roiha has since also played for Utrecht and Zwolle in the Netherlands and for Cercle Brugge in Belgium. He joined ADO Den Haag on a free transfer from Cercle Brugge during the January 2006 transfer window playing his first Eredivisie match with them on 28 January 2007. 

After a short stint with Hungarian club Újpest, the club released him because of an injury in January 2010, and a few days later he signed a two-year contract with HJK Helsinki. However, injuries kept him sidelined for most of the 2009 season and he was released by HJK at the end of the season. In 2010, Roiha joined newly promoted Allsvenskan club Åtvidabergs FF on a free transfer. The club, however, suffered relegation to Superettan and he left after the season. In the 2011 season, Roiha played for Finnish club KuPS. After the season, he decided to retire from football.

International career

Roiha played his first match for the Finnish national team on 1 February 2001 against Sweden; however, he was not able to become a regular for Finland in qualifying matches due to injuries.

International goals 
Finland's score first.

References

External links
 Profile at HJK.fi
 Stats at Veikkausliiga.com

1980 births
Living people
Finnish footballers
Finnish expatriate footballers
Helsingin Jalkapalloklubi players
Cercle Brugge K.S.V. players
FC Utrecht players
PEC Zwolle players
ADO Den Haag players
Újpest FC players
Åtvidabergs FF players
Kuopion Palloseura players
Footballers from Espoo
Finland international footballers
Veikkausliiga players
Eredivisie players
Belgian Pro League players
Allsvenskan players
Expatriate footballers in Belgium
Expatriate footballers in the Netherlands
Expatriate footballers in Hungary
Expatriate footballers in Sweden
Finnish expatriate sportspeople in Belgium
Finnish expatriate sportspeople in the Netherlands
Finnish expatriate sportspeople in Hungary
Finnish expatriate sportspeople in Sweden
Association football forwards